The AIR Awards of 2011 (or Jägermeister Independent Awards of 2011) is the sixth annual Australian Independent Record Labels Association Music Awards (generally known as the AIR Awards) and was an award ceremony at Revolt Art Space, in Melbourne, Australia on 12 October 2011. The event was again sponsored by German liquor brand, Jägermeister. 

The event was broadcast on Australian pay-TV music broadcaster Channel V.

This year was the first for the category, Best Independent Dance, Electronica or Club Single and the win was another first, with it being a tie. The award was shared by Tommy Trash and Tom Piper's "All My Friends" and Seekae's "Blood Bank".

Performers
Adalita
Emma Louise
The Holidays
Illy and Owl Eyes

Nominees and winners

AIR Awards
Winners are listed first and highlighted in boldface; other final nominees are listed alphabetically.

AIR Awards (public voted)

See also
Music of Australia

References

2011 in Australian music
2011 music awards
AIR Awards